Route 206 is a collector road in the Canadian province of Nova Scotia.

It is located in Richmond County and loops around the southwest portion of Isle Madame, connecting with Route 320 at both of its ends.

Communities
Arichat
West Arichat
Martinique

Parks
Lennox Passage Provincial Park
Burnt Island Provincial Park
Pondville Beach Provincial Park

See also
List of Nova Scotia provincial highways

References

Roads in Richmond County, Nova Scotia
Nova Scotia provincial highways